Archaeopodella is a genus of mites in the family Sejidae.

References

Mesostigmata
Articles created by Qbugbot